Cyrtodactylus chanhomeae is a species of gecko, a lizard in the family Gekkonidae. The species is endemic to Thailand.

Etymology
The specific name, chanhomeae (genitive, feminine) is in honor of Thai herpetologist Lawan Chanhome. She specializes in studying the venomous snakes of Thailand.

Geographic range
C. chanhomeae is found in central Thailand, in Saraburi Province.

Habitat
The preferred natural habitat of C. chanhomeae is dry caves.

Description

Reproduction
C. chanhomeae is oviparous.

References

Further reading
Bauer AM, Sumontha M, Pauwels OSG (2003). "Two new species of Cyrtodactylus (Reptilia: Squamata: Gekkonidae) from Thailand". Zootaxa 376: 1–18. (Cyrtodactylus chanhomeae, new species).
Chan-ard T, Parr JWK, Nabhitabhata J (2015). A Field Guide to the Reptiles of Thailand. New York: Oxford University Press. 352 pp.  (hardcover),  (paperback).

Cyrtodactylus
Reptiles described in 2003